Krystyna Leśkiewicz (born 27 July 1974, Wrocław) is a Polish rhythmic gymnast.

Leśkiewicz competed for Poland in the rhythmic gymnastics individual all-around competition at the 1996 Summer Olympics in Atlanta. There she was 21st in the qualification round and did not advance to the semifinal.

She's now coaching her two daughters, also rhythmic gymnasts, the oldest being Liliana Lewinska who won 3 medals at the 2022 European Championship.

References

External links 
 Krystyna Leśkiewicz at Sports-Reference.com
 Krystyna Leśkiewicz on the Polish Olympic Committee website

1974 births
Living people
Polish rhythmic gymnasts
Gymnasts at the 1996 Summer Olympics
Olympic gymnasts of Poland
Sportspeople from Wrocław